Scent of a Woman is a 2011 South Korean television drama series starring Kim Sun-a, Lee Dong-wook, Um Ki-joon and Seo Hyo-rim. It aired on SBS from July 23 to September 11, 2011 on Saturdays and Sundays at 21:55 for 16 episodes.

Synopsis
As a single, unmarried woman in her mid-thirties, Lee Yeon-jae (Kim Sun-a) is meek and timid, considered a spinster by society.  After spending ten years working for the same travel company owned by Kang Chul-man, she is falsely accused of stealing from a client. In addition to enduring the accusations of her superiors, she is diagnosed with gallbladder cancer with approximately six months left to live. Mustering up her courage, Yeon-jae resigns and embraces her remaining six months of life.

Embarking on her first vacation alone, she splurges on clothes and flies first-class to Okinawa Island, Japan, where she runs into the man of her dreams, Kang Ji-wook (Lee Dong-wook), who happens to be the son of her former boss. Ji-wook is a rich young man, cynical and lifeless, until he falls in love with Yeon-jae. Together they live out a series of misadventures, both comical and bittersweet, as Yeon-jae completes each dream in her Bucket List.

Cast

Main characters
Kim Sun-a as Lee Yeon-jae
Lee Dong-wook as Kang Ji-wook
Um Ki-joon as Chae Eun-suk
Seo Hyo-rim as Im Se-kyung

Supporting characters
Kim Hye-ok as Kim Soon-jung, Yeon-jae's mother
Sa Hyun-jin as Yoo Hye-won, Yeon-jae's best friend
Choi Jung-hoon as Oh Sang-mok, Yeon-jae's and Soon-jung's hot-tempered landlord
Lee Jung-gil as Kang Chul-man, Ji-wook's father
Park Jung-sun as Park Sang-woo
Kim Kwang-kyu as Yoon Bong-kil, Yeon-jae's office mate/tango instructor Ramses
Shin Jung-geun as Noh Sang-shik, Yeon-jae's office manager
Son Seong-yoon as Nam Na-ri
Namkoong Won as Im Joong-hee, Se-kyung's father
Shin Ji-soo as Yang Hee-joo, cancer patient who treats Yeon-jae as her elder sister
Cha Ji-yeon as Cha Ji-yeon, tango instructor
Kim Junsu as Kim Junsu (cameo, episode 5)
Kwon Oh-joong as Kwon Yool, Yeon-jae's first love (cameo, episode 8)
Lee Won-jong as Andy Wilson, pianist
Jung Dong-hwan as Kim Dong-myung, Yeon-jae's high school teacher

Original soundtrack
 Blue bird – Rottyful Sky
 You are so beautiful – Junsu
 유앤아이 (You and I) – MBLAQ
 버킷리스트 (Bucket list) – JK Kim Dong-wook
 Better Tomorrow – She'z
 화답 (Response) – Lee Young-hyun
 유앤아이 (You and I) – Fly High
 Una Notte Perfetta – Edan
 Promise U
 Blue Tango
 The Dancer
 Jalousie – La Ventana
 키다리 아저씨 (Daddy-Long-Legs)
 Por una cabeza
 Yeon-jae's Theme
 Babu Babu
 여인의 향기 (Scent of a woman)
 You are so beautiful (Edit ver.) – Junsu

Episode ratings

Awards and nominations

International broadcast
In September 2011, it was announced that the drama's rights were sold eight Asian countries, including Philippines, Hong Kong, Taiwan, Singapore, Cambodia, Malaysia, Indonesia and Vietnam. This was followed by promotional events attended by the two lead actors, Kim Sun-a and Lee Dong-wook on December 5–6 in Singapore and Malaysia, respectively, for ONE TV ASIA.

It first aired in Japan on cable channel KNTV from July 23 to September 11, 2011. It was re-aired on TBS as part of the network's "Hallyu Select Frame" beginning June 7, 2012, and on cable channel BS-Japan.

It first aired in Vietnam on BTV4 from November 15, 2014.

It first aired in Thailand on Channel 7 beginning December 8, 2015.

In Sri Lanka, it is available to stream with subtitles on Iflix.

References

External links
 

2011 South Korean television series debuts
2011 South Korean television series endings
Seoul Broadcasting System television dramas
Korean-language television shows
South Korean romantic comedy television series
Television series by AStory